Yakine Said M'Madi (born 11 March 2004) is a professional footballer who plays as a centre-back for Olympique de Marseille. Born in France, he plays for the Comoros national team.

Career
Said M'Madi is a youth product of the academies of Burel FC and Marseille. He was promoted to the Marseille reserves for the 2021–22 season in the Championnat National 2 season. On 7 April 2022, he made the bench for the senior side in a UEFA Europa Conference League match against the Greek club PAOK FC. He signed his first professional contract wit the club on 13 July 2022, tying him until 2024.

International career
Born in Réunion, France, Attoumani is Comorian descent. He was called up to the preliminary squad for Comoros U20 at the 2022 Maurice Revello Tournament. He was called up to the senior Comoros national team for a set of friendlies in September 2022. He made his debut with Comoros 1–0 friendly loss to Tunisia on 22 September 2022.

References

External links
 
 

2004 births
Living people
Footballers from Marseille
Comorian footballers
Comoros international footballers
French footballers
French sportspeople of Comorian descent
Association football defenders
Championnat National 2 players
Championnat National 3 players
Montpellier HSC players
Olympique de Marseille players